A megatsunami is a very large wave created by a large, sudden displacement of material into a body of water.

Megatsunamis have quite different features from ordinary tsunamis. Ordinary tsunamis are caused by underwater tectonic activity (movement of the earth's plates) and therefore occur along plate boundaries and as a result of earthquakes and the subsequent rise or fall in the sea floor that displaces a volume of water. By contrast, megatsunamis occur when a large amount of material suddenly falls into water or anywhere near water (such as via a meteor impact or volcanic activity). They can have extremely large initial wave heights ranging from hundreds and possibly up to thousands of metres, far beyond the height of any ordinary tsunami. These giant wave heights occur because the water is "splashed" upwards and outwards by the impact or displacement.

Examples of modern megatsunamis include the one associated with the 1883 eruption of Krakatoa (volcanic eruption), the 1958 Lituya Bay megatsunami (landslide into a bay), and the wave resulting from the Vajont Dam landslide (caused by human activity destabilizing sides of valley). Prehistoric examples include the Storegga Slide (landslide), and the Chicxulub, Chesapeake Bay, and Eltanin meteor impacts.

Overview 

A megatsunami is a tsunami with an initial wave amplitude (height) measured in many tens, hundreds, and possibly up to thousands of metres. A megatsunami is a separate class of event from an ordinary tsunami and is caused by different physical mechanisms.

Normal tsunamis result from displacement of the sea floor due to plate tectonics. Powerful earthquakes may cause the sea floor to displace vertically on the order of tens of metres, which in turn displaces the water column above and leads to the formation of a tsunami. In deep water it is possible that a tsunami could pass beneath a ship without the crew of the vessel noticing. As it approaches land, the wave height of an ordinary tsunami increases dramatically as the sea floor slopes upward and the base of the wave pushes the water column above it upwards.

By contrast, megatsunamis are caused by landslides and other impact events that displace large volumes of water, resulting in waves that may exceed the height of an ordinary tsunami by tens or even hundreds of metres. Underwater earthquakes or volcanic eruptions do not normally generate megatsunamis, but landslides next to bodies of water resulting from earthquakes or volcanic eruptions can, since they cause a much larger amount of water displacement. If the landslide or impact occurs in a limited body of water, as happened at the Vajont Dam (1963) and in Lituya Bay (1958) then the water may be unable to disperse and one or more exceedingly large waves may result.

Determining a height range typical of megatsunamis is a complex and scientifically debated topic. This complexity is increased due to the fact that two different heights are often reported for tsunamis – the height of the wave itself in open water, and the height to which it surges when it encounters land. Depending upon the locale, this second or so-called "run-up height" can be several times larger than the wave's height just before reaching shore. While there is currently no minimum or average height classification for megatsunamis that is broadly accepted by the scientific community, the limited number of observed megatsunami events in recent history have all had run-up heights that exceeded . It is also possible that much larger megatsunamis occurred in prehistory; researchers analyzing the geological structures left behind by prehistoric asteroid impacts have suggested that these events could have resulted in megatsunamis that exceeded  in height.

Recognition of the concept of megatsunami

Before the 1950s, scientists had theorized that tsunamis orders of magnitude larger than those observed with earthquakes could have occurred as a result of ancient geological processes, but no concrete evidence of the existence of these "monster waves" had yet been gathered. Geologists searching for oil in Alaska in 1953 observed that in Lituya Bay, mature tree growth did not extend to the shoreline as it did in many other bays in the region. Rather, there was a band of younger trees closer to the shore. Forestry workers, glaciologists, and geographers call the boundary between these bands a trim line. Trees just above the trim line showed severe scarring on their seaward side, while those from below the trim line did not. This indicated that a large force had impacted all of the elder trees above the trim line, and presumably had killed off all the trees below it. Based on this evidence, the scientists hypothesized that there had been an unusually large wave or waves in the deep inlet. Because this is a recently deglaciated fjord with steep slopes and crossed by a major fault (the Fairweather Fault), one possibility was that this wave was a landslide-generated tsunami.

On July 9, 1958, a 7.8  strike-slip earthquake in southeast Alaska caused  of rock and ice to drop into the deep water at the head of Lituya Bay. They were washed back into the bay and both survived.

Analysis of mechanism
The mechanism giving rise to megatsunamis was analysed for the Lituya Bay event in a study presented at the Tsunami Society in 1999; this model was considerably developed and modified by a second study in 2010.

Although the earthquake which caused the megatsunami was considered very energetic, it was determined that it could not have been the sole contributor based on the measured height of the wave. Neither water drainage from a lake, nor a landslide, nor the force of the earthquake itself were sufficient to create a megatsunami of the size observed, although all of these may have been contributing factors.

Instead, the megatsunami was caused by a combination of events in quick succession. The primary event occurred in the form of a large and sudden impulsive impact when about 40 million cubic yards of rock several hundred metres above the bay was fractured by the earthquake, and fell "practically as a monolithic unit" down the almost-vertical slope and into the bay. The rockfall also caused air to be "dragged along" due to viscosity effects, which added to the volume of displacement, and further impacted the sediment on the floor of the bay, creating a large crater. The study concluded that:

A 2010 model examined the amount of infill on the floor  of the bay, which was many times larger than that of the rockfall alone, and also the energy and height of the waves, and the accounts given by eyewitnesses, concluded that there had been a "dual slide" involving a rockfall, which also triggered a release of 5 to 10 times its volume of sediment trapped by the adjacent Lituya Glacier, as an almost immediate and many times larger second slide, a ratio comparable with other events where this "dual slide" effect is known to have happened.

List of megatsunamis

Prehistoric 
During the Messinian the coasts of northern Chile were likely struck by various megatsunamis.
A megatsunami affected the coast of south–central Chile in the Pliocene as evidenced by the sedimentary record of Ranquil Formation.
 The northern half of the East Molokai Volcano on Molokai in Hawaii suffered a catastrophic collapse about 1.5 million years ago, generating a megatsunami, and now lies as a debris field scattered northward across the ocean bottom, while what remains on the island are the highest sea cliffs in the world. The megatsunami may have reached a height of  near its origin and reached California and Mexico.
The existence of large scattered boulders in only one of the four marine terraces of Herradura Bay south of the Chilean city of Coquimbo has been interpreted by Roland Paskoff as the result of a mega-tsunami that occurred in the Middle Pleistocene.
Much of the water in the megatsunamis washed over the lake's outlet at what is now Tahoe City, California, and flooded down the Truckee River, carrying house-sized boulders as far downstream as the California-Nevada border at what is now Verdi, California.
 In the North Sea, the Storegga Slide caused a megatsunami approximately 8,200 years ago. It is estimated to have completely flooded the remainder of Doggerland.
 Approximately 8,000 years ago, a large volcanic landslide off Mount Etna, Sicily caused a megatsunami which devastated the eastern Mediterranean coastline on three continents.

Historic

c. 2000 BC: Réunion 
 A landslide on Réunion island, to the east of Madagascar, may have caused a megatsunami.

c. 1600 BC: Santorini 

 The Thera volcano erupted, the force of the eruption causing megatsunamis which affected the whole Aegean Sea and the eastern Mediterranean Sea.

Modern

1731: Storfjorden, Norway

At 10:00 p.m. on January 8, 1731, a landslide with a volume of possibly  fell from the mountain Skafjell from a height of  into the Storfjorden opposite Stranda, Norway. Damaging waves struck as far as way as Ørskog. The waves killed 17 people.

1756: Langfjorden, Norway
The waves killed 32 people and destroyed 168 buildings, 196 boats, large amounts of forest, and roads and boat landings.

1792: Mount Unzen, Japan 

In 1792, Mount Unzen in Japan erupted, causing part of the volcano to collapse into the sea.

1853–1854: Lituya Bay, Alaska 

Sometime between August 1853 and May 1854, a megatsunami occurred in Lituya Bay in what was then Russian America. Studies of Lituya Bay between 1948 and 1953 first identified the event, which probably occurred because of a large landslide on the south shore of the bay near Mudslide Creek.

1874: Lituya Bay, Alaska 

A study of Lituya Bay in 1953 concluded that sometime around 1874, perhaps in May 1874, another megatsunami occurred in Lituya Bay in Alaska.

1883: Krakatoa

The eruption of Krakatoa created pyroclastic flows which generated megatsunamis when they hit the waters of the Sunda Strait on 27 August 1883. The waves reached heights of up to 24 metres (79 feet) along the south coast of Sumatra and up to 42 metres (138 feet) along the west coast of Java.

1905: Lovatnet, Norway 

1905: Disenchantment Bay, Alaska 

1934: Tafjorden, Norway 

Large waves struck Tafjord and Fjørå. At Fjørå, waves reached , destroyed buildings, removed all soil, and killed 17 people. One survivor suffered serious injuries requiring hospitalization.

1936: Lovatnet, Norway 

The waves destroyed all farms at Bødal and most farms at Nesdal — completely washing away 16 farms — as well as 100 houses, bridges, a power station, a workshop, a sawmill, several grain mills, a restaurant, a schoolhouse, and all boats on the lake. The waves killed 74 people and severely injured 11.

1936: Lituya Bay, Alaska 

The cause of the megatsunami remains unclear, but may have been a submarine landslide.

1958: Lituya Bay, Alaska, US 

The wave surged over the headland, stripping trees and soil down to bedrock, and surged along the fjord which forms Lituya Bay, destroying two fishing boats anchored there and killing two people. This was the highest wave of any kind ever recorded. The subsequent study of this event led to the establishment of the term "megatsunami," to distinguish it from ordinary tsunamis.

1963: Vajont Dam, Italy 

On October 9, 1963, a landslide above Vajont Dam in Italy produced a  surge that overtopped the dam and destroyed the villages of Longarone, Pirago, Rivalta, Villanova, and Faè, killing nearly 2,000 people. This is currently the only known example of a megatsunami that was indirectly caused by human activities.

1980: Spirit Lake, Washington, US 

On May 18, 1980, the upper  of Mount St. Helens collapsed, creating a landslide. This released the pressure on the magma trapped beneath the summit bulge which exploded as a lateral blast, which then released the pressure on the magma chamber and resulted in a plinian eruption.

Above the upper limit of the tsunami, trees lie where they were knocked down by the pyroclastic surge; below the limit, the fallen trees and the surge deposits were removed by the megatsunami and deposited in Spirit Lake.

2015: Taan Fiord, Alaska, US 

At 8:19 p.m. Alaska Daylight Time on October 17, 2015, the side of a mountain collapsed, at the head of Taan Fiord, a finger of Icy Bay in Alaska.

Occurring in an uninhabited area, the event was unwitnessed, and several hours passed before the signature of the landslide was noticed on seismographs at Columbia University in New York City.

2020: Elliot Creek, British Columbia, Canada 
On 28 November 2020, unseasonably heavy rainfall triggered a landslide of  into a glacial lake at the head of Elliot Creek.

Potential future megatsunamis 
In a BBC television documentary broadcast in 2000, experts said that they thought that a landslide on a volcanic ocean island is the most likely future cause of a megatsunami. This research was later found to be flawed. The documentary was produced before the experts' scientific paper was published and before responses were given by other geologists. There have been megatsunamis in the past, and future megatsunamis are possible but current geological consensus is that these are only local. A megatsunami in the Canary Islands would diminish to a normal tsunami by the time it reached the continents. Also, the current consensus for La Palma is that the region conjectured to collapse is too small and too geologically stable to do so in the next 10,000 years, although there is evidence for past megatsunamis local to the Canary Islands thousands of years ago. Similar remarks apply to the suggestion of a megatsunami in Hawaii.

British Columbia 
Some geologists consider an unstable rock face at Mount Breakenridge, above the north end of the giant fresh-water fjord of Harrison Lake in the Fraser Valley of southwestern British Columbia, Canada, to be unstable enough to collapse into the lake, generating a megatsunami that might destroy the town of Harrison Hot Springs (located at its south end).

Canary Islands 

Geologists Dr. Simon Day and Dr. Steven Neal Ward consider that a megatsunami could be generated during an eruption of Cumbre Vieja on the volcanic ocean island of La Palma, in the Canary Islands, Spain. Day and Ward hypothesize that if such an eruption causes the western flank to fail, a megatsunami could be generated.

In 1949, an eruption occurred at three of the volcano's vents—Duraznero, Hoyo Negro, and Llano del Banco. A local geologist, Juan Bonelli-Rubio, witnessed the eruption and recorded details on various phenomenon related to the eruption. As a result, the western half of the volcano—which is the volcanically active arm of a triple-armed rift—had slipped approximately  downwards and  westwards towards the Atlantic Ocean.

In 1971, an eruption occurred at the Teneguía vent at the southern end of the sub-aerial section of the volcano without any movement. The section affected by the 1949 eruption is currently stationary and does not appear to have moved since the initial rupture.

Cumbre Vieja remained dormant until an eruption began on September 19, 2021.

It is likely that several eruptions would be required before failure would occur on Cumbre Vieja. Tens of millions of lives could be lost in the cities and/or towns of St. John's, Halifax, Boston, New York, Baltimore, Washington, D.C., Miami, Havana and the rest of the eastern coasts of the United States and Canada, as well as many other cities on the Atlantic coast in Europe, South America and Africa. The likelihood of this happening is a matter of vigorous debate.

Geologists and volcanologists are in general agreement that the initial study was flawed. The current geology does not suggest that a collapse is imminent. Indeed, it seems to be geologically impossible right now—the region conjectured as prone to collapse is too small and too stable to collapse within the next 10,000 years. A closer study of deposits left in the ocean from previous landslides suggests that a landslide would likely occur as a series of smaller collapses rather than a single landslide. This seems to have been local to Gran Canaria.

Day and Ward have admitted that their original analysis of the danger was based on several worst case assumptions. A 2008 study examined this scenario and concluded that while it could cause a megatsunami, it would be local to the Canary Islands and would diminish in height, becoming a smaller tsunami by the time it reached the continents as the waves interfered and spread across the oceans.

For more details see Cumbre Vieja potential megatsunami.

Cape Verde Islands 

Steep cliffs on the Cape Verde Islands have been caused by catastrophic debris avalanches. These have been common on the submerged flanks of ocean island volcanoes.

Hawaii 
Sharp cliffs and associated ocean debris at the Kohala Volcano, Lanai and Molokai indicate that landslides from the flank of the Kilauea and Mauna Loa volcanoes in Hawaii may have triggered past megatsunamis, most recently at 120,000 BP. Also, the West Coast of America and the entire Pacific Rim could potentially be affected.

Other research suggests that such a single large landslide is not likely. Instead, it would collapse as a series of smaller landslides.

In 2018, shortly after the beginning of the 2018 lower Puna eruption, a National Geographic article responded to such claims with "Will a monstrous landslide off the side of Kilauea trigger a monster tsunami bound for California? Short answer: No."

In the same article, geologist Mika McKinnon stated:

Another volcanologist, Janine Krippner, added:

Despite this, evidence suggests that catastrophic collapses do occur on Hawaiian volcanoes and generate local tsunamis.

Norway 

The predicted disaster is depicted in the 2015 Norwegian film The Wave.

See also 
 2004 Indian Ocean earthquake and tsunami
 List of tsunamis
 Tsunamis in lakes
 Volcanic tsunami

References

Footnotes

Bibliography 
 
 
 Lander, James F. Tsunamis Affecting Alaska 1737-1996. Boulder, Colorado: NOAA National Geophysical Data Center, September 1996.

Further reading 
 BBC 2 TV; 2000. Transcript "Mega-tsunami; Wave of Destruction", Horizon. First screened 21.30 hrs, Thursday, 12 October 2000.
 
 
 
 
 
 Rihm, R; Krastel, S. & CD109 Shipboard Scientific Party; 1998. Volcanoes and landslides in the Canaries. National Environment Research Council News. Summer, 16–17.
 
 
 Sandom, J.G., 2010, The Wave — A John Decker Thriller, Cornucopia Press, 2010. A thriller in which a megatsunami is intentionally created when a terrorist detonates a nuclear bomb on La Palma in the Canary Islands.
 Ortiz, J.R., Bonelli Rubio, J.M., 1951. La erupción del Nambroque (junio-agosto de 1949). Madrid: Talleres del Instituto Geográfico y Catastral, 100 p., 1h. pleg.;23 cm

External links

Mega Tsunami: history, causes, effects
World's Biggest Tsunami: The largest recorded tsunami with a wave 1720 feet tall in Lituya Bay, Alaska.
Benfield Hazard Research Centre
BBC — Mega-tsunami: Wave of Destruction BBC Two program broadcast 12 October 2000
La Palma threat "over-hyped" , BBC News, 29 October 2004
Mega-hyped Tsunami story A detailed of analysis demolishing the La Palma Tsunami speculation.

 
Water waves
Geological hazards
Tsunami
Oceanographical terminology